St. Mary’s Church, Hamilton Village, is an Episcopal Church located on the University of Pennsylvania campus in Philadelphia, Pennsylvania. It calls itself the  Episcopal Church at Penn to emphasize its campus ministry. The parish is part of the Episcopal Church in the Diocese of Pennsylvania. In 2020, it reported 225 members, 51 average attendance, and plate and pledge financial support of $95,097.

The church is a remnant of the Hamilton Village neighborhood that existed in West Philadelphia prior to being subsumed by the University. The land was given to the church by the Hamilton family for whom the town was named.

Background

Founded in the early 19th century to serve as a summer congregation for Philadelphians who were vacationing west of the Schuylkill River, it soon had year-round services. The current building dates from 1872 and the parish hall from 1896. During the mid-19th century the parish became a focal point for the Anglo-Catholic movement, which the Rector and congregation supported. St. Mary's played a leading role in supporting African-American civil rights, the anti-war movement of the Vietnam era, women's ordination within the Episcopal Church, and the lesbian/gay community's quest for full acceptance.

A former rector, the Rev. John Scott, was known for having performed an exorcism of the Philadelphia campaign headquarters of Richard Nixon, and was the founder of the Philadelphia Third Order Franciscans, a worldwide lay religious community. In the 1970s the parish was host to the local chapter of IntegrityUSA, immediately after the chapter's founding, and before the chapter moved to Center City.  Due to its proximity to the Philadelphia Divinity School (which has now merged with Episcopal Divinity School and closed its facilities in Philadelphia), many seminarians often attended services here in the days immediately preceding the ordination of the Philadelphia Eleven and the eventual admission of women to the priesthood in 1976.

The parish hall houses a nursery school and The Bearded Ladies Cabaret. The sanctuary is often used for concerts. The Rev. Mariclair Partee Carlsen was called as Rector and Episcopal Chaplain to the University of Pennsylvania in March 2013.

See also

University City, Philadelphia
Neighborhood Bike Works

External links
 St. Mary's Church Official Site
 St. Mary's Nursery School Official Site
 The Gatherings Concert Series
 Guidebook to St. Mary's Church, Hamilton Village (1946) from Philadelphia Studies
 Directory for St. Mary's Church, Hamilton Village, for 1928
 Directory for St. Mary's Church, Hamilton Village, for 1929
 Directory for St. Mary's Church, Hamilton Village, for 1932
 Directory for St. Mary's Church, Hamilton Village, for 1948
 Directory for St. Mary's Church, Hamilton Village, for 1949

References

Mary
Churches completed in 1872
19th-century Episcopal church buildings
Mary
Mary
University City, Philadelphia